"One Day When I Grow Up" is a song by Dutch pop group Ch!pz, featured on the 2006 EP Past:Present:Future. It peaked at #7 on the Netherlands Dutch Top 40, and #2 on the Netherlands Single Top 100. The music video for the song was included on the EP's accompanying DVD.

Charts

Weekly charts

Year-end charts

References

2006 singles
2006 songs
Ch!pz songs